The Great Leap may refer to:

The Great Leap (film) (German: Der grosse Sprung), 1927 German silent comedy film directed by Arnold Fanck and starring Leni Riefenstahl,
The Great Leap (Phideaux album)
The Great Leap (David Tao album) (Chinese: 太平盛世; pinyin: Tài Píng Chéng Shì)
"The Great Leap", song by Mortiis
"The Great Leap", play by Lauren Yee

See also
The Great Leap Forward 
Great Leap Forward (disambiguation)